Corticoris is a genus of jumping tree bugs in the family Miridae. There are about nine described species in Corticoris.

Species
These nine species belong to the genus Corticoris:
 Corticoris infuscatus Henry & Herring, 1979
 Corticoris libertus (Gibson, 1917)
 Corticoris mexicanus Henry & Herring, 1979
 Corticoris pallidus T.Henry, 1984
 Corticoris pintoi T.Henry, 1984
 Corticoris pubescens T.Henry, 1984
 Corticoris pulchellus (Heidemann, 1908)
 Corticoris signatus (Heidemann, 1908)
 Corticoris unicolor (Heidemann, 1908)

References

Further reading

 
 
 

Miridae
Articles created by Qbugbot